Waldon O. Watson (January 20, 1907 – August 15, 1986) was an American sound engineer. He was nominated for six Academy Awards in the category Sound Recording. He worked on nearly 150 films between 1948 and 1973.

Selected filmography
 Flower Drum Song (1961)
 That Touch of Mink (1962)
 Captain Newman, M.D. (1963)
 Father Goose (1964)
 Shenandoah (1965)
 Gambit (1966)

References

External links

1907 births
1986 deaths
American audio engineers
People from Los Angeles
Recipients of the John A. Bonner Medal of Commendation
Engineers from California
20th-century American engineers
Academy Award for Technical Achievement winners